Toncho Todorov (born 27 September 1958) is a Bulgarian gymnast. He competed in eight events at the 1976 Summer Olympics.

References

1958 births
Living people
Bulgarian male artistic gymnasts
Olympic gymnasts of Bulgaria
Gymnasts at the 1976 Summer Olympics
Place of birth missing (living people)